Avtury GRU ambush was the July 4, 2006 ambush in Chechnya.

The attack

15-20 Chechen rebel fighters led by Abu Hafs al-Urduni and armed with heavy machine guns, assault rifles, grenade launchers and rocket-propelled grenades opened fire from a forested area in Avtury on a motorized column of the GRU Spetsnaz 16th Brigade from  Tambov, composed of several military trucks and one armored personnel carrier.

The attack, which lasted for about an hour, completely destroyed the motorized column, killed between 7 and 30 Russian soldiers, and wounded as many as 30 others; effectively stopping the flow of reinforcements and weapons to Russian troops in Avtury Chechnya, according to Russian sources. Separatist websites announced the attack was a "meticulously planned act of revenge" by Commanders Abu Hafs al-Urduni and Abu Yassir for the death of the Chechen rebel leader Abdul-Halim Sadulayev. They said the Russians lost "close to 40" men and that they themselves suffered no casualties. A video of the attack which circulates on the internet was made giving a tribute to Abdul-Halim Sadulayev and then showing the planning and execution of the attack.

On the same day, Russian President Vladimir Putin said the term "combat operations" can no longer be used with regards to Chechnya: "There are outbursts of terrorist actions, but no combat actions in Chechnya," Putin said.

References

2006 in Russia
Battles of the Second Chechen War
Battles involving Chechnya
Filmed killings
July 2006 events in Russia
Ambushes